The Psilis or Psillis (Ψίλλις) was a river of ancient Bithynia that drained to the Pontus Euxinus.

It is identified with the modern .

References

Geography of Bithynia
Rivers of Turkey
Ancient Greek geography